Jacques Laurens de Waru (23 November 1865 – 21 May 1911) was a French equestrian. He competed in the equestrian mail coach event at the 1900 Summer Olympics.

References

External links
 

1865 births
1911 deaths
French male equestrians
Olympic equestrians of France
Equestrians at the 1900 Summer Olympics
Sportspeople from Yvelines